Events from the year 1854 in Canada.

Incumbents
Monarch — Victoria

Federal government
Parliament — 4th then 5th

Governors
Governor General of the Province of Canada — James Bruce, 8th Earl of Elgin, Edmund Walker Head
Colonial Governor of Newfoundland — Charles Henry Darling
Governor of New Brunswick — Edmund Walker Head, John Manners-Sutton
Governor of Nova Scotia — John Gaspard Le Marchant
Governor of Prince Edward Island — Dominick Daly

Premiers
Joint Premiers of the Province of Canada —
Francis Hincks, Canada West Premier
Augustin-Norbert Morin, Canada East Premier 
Premier of New Brunswick — Charles Fisher
Premier of Nova Scotia — James Boyle Uniacke
Premier of Prince Edward Island — John Holl

Events
January 27 – The Great Western Railway opens, linking Toronto, Hamilton and Windsor.
June 6 – The Canadian–American Reciprocity Treaty is signed
October 27 – A Great Western Railway passenger train collides with the tail end of gravel train at Baptiste Creek, Canada West. At least 52 people are killed.
Establishment of the African Baptist Association of Nova Scotia.
St. Joseph's Academy for Young Ladies, later to be known as St. Joseph's College School, was founded by the Sisters of St. Joseph of Toronto.
 Sale of the Clergy Reserves in Canada West marking the end of any form of established religion in Canada.

Births

April 13 – William Henry Drummond, poet (died 1907)
May 21 – Edward Gawler Prior, mining engineer, politician and Premier of British Columbia (died 1920)
June 8 – Douglas Colin Cameron, politician and Lieutenant-Governor of Manitoba (died 1921)
June 26 – Robert Borden, lawyer, politician and 8th Prime Minister of Canada (died 1937)
August 29 – Arthur Peters, politician and Premier of Prince Edward Island (died 1908)
September 1 – James Alexander Lougheed, businessman and politician (died 1925)

Deaths
 January 20 – Denis-Benjamin Papineau, joint premier of the Province of Canada (born 1789)
 September 19 – Sir George Arthur, 1st Baronet, army officer and colonial administrator (born 1784)

References 

 
Canada
Years of the 19th century in Canada
1854 in North America